Dark Wood is a solo album by cellist David Darling recorded in 1993 and released on the ECM label.  The album is Darling's third solo release following Journal October (1979) and Cello (1992)

Reception
The Allmusic review by Rick Anderson awarded the album 3 stars stating "However mannered the presentation may be, though, this music is really stunning. All of it moves slowly, like a dark cloud formation, as spare lines pile up on one other and pizzicato sections nudge up against long, sustained tones... Highly recommended".

Track listing
All compositions by David Darling
 "Darkwood IV: Dawn" - 5:16 
 "Darkwood IV: In Motion" - 4:18 
 "Darkwood IV: Journey" - 5:13 
 "Darkwood V: Light" - 1:05 
 "Darkwood V: Earth" - 4:33 
 "Darkwood V: Passage" - 0:55 
 "Darkwood VI: Beginning" - 2:10 
 "Darkwood VI: Up Side Down" - 2:00 
 "Darkwood VI: Searching" - 2:53 
 "Darkwood VI: Medieval Dance" - 3:53 
 "Darkwood VII: The Picture" - 3:51 
 "Darkwood VII: Returning" - 3:12 
 "Darkwood VII: New Morning" - 5:09 
Recorded at Rainbow Studio on Oslo, Norway in July 1993

Personnel
David Darling - cello

References

ECM Records albums
David Darling (musician) albums
Albums produced by Manfred Eicher
1995 albums